Jean Yoon (born May 4, 1962) is an American-born Canadian actress and writer of Korean descent. Yoon is best known for originating the role of family matriarch Umma in the 2011 play Kim's Convenience and in the award-winning CBC Television series adapted from the play, for which she won an ACTRA Award and received two Canadian Screen Award nominations.

Early life 
Yoon was born in Champaign, Illinois to parents of Korean descent in 1962 and subsequently raised in Toronto, where she currently resides and works.

Career

1980s–1990s: Early career in theatre 
Yoon started her career in theatre as an actress in the early 1980s, but soon quit in frustration after she struggled to find work and went on to complete her degree at the University of Toronto (BA Innis 1989). A decade later, in 1995, she returned to acting and started her own group called Loud Mouth Asian Babes, through which she has written and produced plays that focus on the Korean diaspora, mostly in Canada.

2000s: Transition into television and film 
Yoon's acting career began to flourish in the early 2000s, with small roles in several television series, including La Femme Nikita (1996–2001), Witchblade (TNT, 2000–2002) and Street Time (Showtime, 2001–2003). In 2006, Yoon achieved wider recognition after playing flight attendant Betty Ong in the controversial mini-series The Path to 9/11. Also in 2006, Yoon had a recurring role as June Kim in the legal drama series This Is Wonderland.

In 2007, Yoon received a Gemini Award nomination for her work in the CBC mini-series Dragon Boys. In 2009, she portrayed Dr. Montague in the hit romantic comedy film The Time Traveller's Wife, based on the novel of the same name.

2010s–present: Further success in television 
Throughout the 2010s, Yoon has played a wide array of characters in several television programs, most notably Imena Khumalo in the medical drama series Remedy (2014–2015), Connie in the animated series Peg+Cat (2013–2016), Captain Theresa Yao in the science fiction series The Expanse (2015), and Janis Beckwith in the hit BBC-Space series Orphan Black.

Kim's Convenience 

From 2016 to 2021, Yoon has portrayed Kim Yong-mi ("Umma"), the matriarch of the Kim family, in the CBC sitcom Kim's Convenience. She also portrayed the same role in the 2011 play, which she originated and performed over 240 times in six cities.

For her role in the television series, she has received considerable attention and has publicly discussed the importance of diversity in mainstream media, specifically for Asian Canadians and immigrants. In an interview with the CBC, Yoon said:  The generational conflict between first generation and second generation immigrants, it's rich territory, and if you've lived through it, I mean, it's laugh and cry, laugh and cry, laugh and cry. But we haven't seen those stories on television on a national level. We are starting to see those stories coming out in novels and in theatre ... We are starting to see an awareness that this is territory that hasn't been explored. There's comedy there, there's talent there, and there's a sudden pop of interest. But also it's a question of critical mass.

For her role on Kim's Convenience, Yoon won an ACTRA Award, and was a five-time Canadian Screen Award nominee for Best Actress in a Comedy Series, winning at the 10th Canadian Screen Awards in 2022. Yoon played the role for the show's entire five-season run.

Other work 
Yoon is also a writer and playwright. She has written severals plays, poems, and essays, including The Yoko Ono Project, a multi-media performance art comedy about Ono, her art, and her impact, which earned a Dora Mavor Moore Award nomination and a Jessie Richardson Award.

In December 2022, Yoon and retired South Korean competitive figure skater Yuna Kim were made as honorary ambassadors on the occasion of the 60th anniversary of the diplomatic relations between Canada and South Korea in 2023.

Filmography

Film

Television

Personal life 
Yoon has a son; in a 2017 interview with NOW Magazine, she described herself as a "mom who acts."

References

External links

1962 births
Living people
20th-century Canadian actresses
20th-century Canadian dramatists and playwrights
20th-century Canadian poets
20th-century Canadian women writers
21st-century Canadian actresses
21st-century Canadian dramatists and playwrights
21st-century Canadian poets
21st-century Canadian women writers
Actresses from Illinois
Actresses from Toronto
Canadian actresses of Korean descent
Canadian film actresses
Canadian Film Centre alumni
Canadian people of Korean descent
Canadian stage actresses
Canadian television actresses
Canadian voice actresses
Canadian women dramatists and playwrights
Canadian women poets
Canadian writers of Asian descent
People from Champaign, Illinois
University of Toronto alumni
Writers from Illinois
Writers from Toronto
21st-century American women
Best Actress in a Comedy Series Canadian Screen Award winners